Arma 3 is an open world realism-based military tactical shooter video game developed and published by Bohemia Interactive exclusively through the Steam distribution platform. It is the third main entry in the Arma series, and the eighth installment in the series overall. Arma 3 was released for Microsoft Windows on September 12, 2013, and for macOS and Linux on August 31, 2015.

Arma 3 primarily takes place in the mid-2030s, on the fictional islands of Altis and Stratis in the South Mediterranean Sea. The game's expansions are set on the South Pacific island of Tanoa; the Strait of Gibraltar island of Malden; the Eastern European country of Livonia; the Western Saharan country of Argana; and several real-life locations, including parts of Mainland Southeast Asia, Germany, and Central Europe. The game's maps feature photorealistic terrain and water environments. The game features multiple singleplayer and co-op campaigns, released episodically, most of which follow various perspectives surrounding the 2035 Altis Incident, a war fought in Altis and Stratis.

Arma 3 was released to generally favorable reception, with praise toward the visuals and immersive realism, but criticism toward the difficulty for new players and the lack of singleplayer content on release. Arma 3 has been actively maintained and expanded by Bohemia Interactive and publishing partners, with almost twenty significant updates and downloadable content (DLC) releases since 2014. Almost a decade since its release, Arma 3 maintains a substantial player base and an active modding community.

Gameplay 

Arma 3 is a realistic tactical shooter featuring accurate and deadly weapons that are heavily affected by external ballistics and recoil. Gameplay is set on expansive maps (officially "terrains") featuring photorealistic land and water environments that can cover hundreds of square kilometers of ground.

Arma 3's gameplay is similar to previous titles in the series, but with more refinements and customization, including a refreshed HUD. Most aspects of gameplay—such as player guidance assists like map markers and enemy outlines, NPC behavior like radio callouts and firing accuracy, and HUD elements like crosshairs and player information—vary depending on the set difficulty level, which can be freely customized to suit the player's desired experience.

Arma 3 primarily focuses on infantry, but a wide selection of usable vehicles, including combat vehicles, armored fighting vehicles, military helicopters, multirole combat aircraft, motorboats, and civilian passenger vehicles, are essential to gameplay and are frequently expanded on in the game's DLCs. Arma 3 also introduces diving to the series, with diving equipment and an underwater firearm implemented for underwater frogman operations. The game's campaigns and scenarios place the player in a wide variety of situations, from infiltration and reconnaissance to the commanding of combined arms operations. Though most missions have specific objectives, for the most part, players are encouraged to choose their own approach to achieving them, ranging from silently eliminating targets as a lone marksman to leading a multirole squad into battle from multiple flanks. In some situations, various resources may be at the player's disposal, including UAVs and fire support from artillery and mortars. Certain campaigns change gameplay elements or add unique features; for example, the Old Man mini-campaign is set in an interactive open world and features a disguise mechanic.

Arma 3 and its DLCs contain over 50 unique weapons of varying type, caliber, and purpose, including rifles, submachine guns, machine guns, sniper rifles, handguns, and rocket launchers (primarily MANPADS and ATGM launchers), with additional variants of some weapons such as carbines and underbarrel grenade launchers. Weapon attachments mostly consist of scopes, though suppressors, flashlights, laser sights, and bipods are also available for most guns. Equipment such as fragmentation grenades, smoke grenades, landmines, chemlights, medkits, binoculars, laser designators, and night vision goggles can be used to varying effects. Standard tools such as maps, GPS satnavs, compasses, and radios operate basic in-game functions that are disabled if they are removed; for example, removing the radio disables NPC radio messages and multiplayer communication. The player's uniform, vest, backpack, headgear, and eyewear can be customized; vests and backpacks in particular allow for additional gear to be carried, and most vests and headgear provide varying levels of ballistic protection. Clothing and carried items add weight to the player, which decreases movement speed and stamina, encouraging proper inventory management and promoting cooperation between soldiers carrying different equipment.

Multiplayer servers, hosted officially and by third parties, offer various PvP and PvE modes, ranging from combined arms battles across an entire terrain to custom roleplaying servers that simulate civilian life. Arma 3 also features "units", the community's official multiplayer clan system.

Arma 3 includes a scenario editor that allows players to create custom singleplayer and multiplayer scenarios using assets and scripting. Scenarios created in the editor can be uploaded directly to the Steam Workshop.

Synopsis

Setting

Arma 3 takes place in the Arma series' fictional universe, set in the near future of the 2030s, during a period of global instability following decades of Western isolationism. The main plot events are mostly set in the Aegean Sea island nation of the Republic of Altis and Stratis, and take place primarily in the period of 2034–2038, with the Beyond Hope mini-campaign set in 2026 and the First Contact campaign set in 2039.

The two primary factions in Arma 3 are the North Atlantic Treaty Organization (NATO) and the opposing Canton Protocol Strategic Alliance Treaty (CSAT; based on the Shanghai Cooperation Organisation). Other factions include the Altis Armed Forces (AAF), the military of Altis and Stratis who rule the country under a junta; the Freedom and Independence Army (FIA), a loyalist rebel militia led by Altis and Stratis' democratic government in exile; the Combat Technology Research Group (CTRG), NATO's classified black operations special forces unit; the International Development and Aid Project (IDAP), a humanitarian aid non-governmental organization; the Gendarmerie, the Horizon Islands' gendarmerie and defense force; Syndikat, a Tanoan criminal organization that later reforms into L'Ensemble, a guerilla army that is officially anti-imperialist but practically no different from its predecessor; and the Livonian Defense Force (LDF), Livonia's NATO-equipped military. Factions are sorted into three forces: BLUFOR (NATO and allies), REDFOR (CSAT and allies), and INDFOR (independent forces that are not officially part of either side).

The plot of Arma 3 takes place over a variety of campaigns, showcase missions, and scenarios. The story is primarily told across eight campaigns: Prologue, The East Wind, Remnants of War, Apex Protocol, Old Man, Tac-Ops, Altis Requiem, and First Contact. Only Prologue and The East Wind are available in the base game, while the rest require their respective DLCs; additionally, the events of First Contact are considered non-canon.

Prologue 
After a coup d'état and civil war leaves Altis and Stratis destabilized and under the AAF's control, NATO and CSAT deploy separate peacekeeping operations to the country to quell conflict between the AAF and FIA. In May 2034, Sergeant Conway and Staff Sergeant Thomas Adams of the U.S. Army train a group of inexperienced AAF soldiers, but are interrupted when a nearby AAF unit calls for assistance. Conway and Adams locate the unit and find they have conducted a botched raid on an FIA hideout. A week later, the AAF attempts to negotiate a ceasefire with the FIA in Altis' capital of Kavala. Conway and Adams are sent to locate a missing AAF convoy, and find it has been ambushed by the FIA. After a skirmish with FIA forces, Conway and Adams are ordered back to Kavala, where they find the AAF has repelled an FIA attack but is using excessive force against the defeated rebels. Conway rebukes an AAF officer for abusing a group of captives, but Adams and NATO command order him to stand down; after they leave, Adams reveals the officer was Colonel Georgious Akhanteros, the de facto president of Altis. Intertitles reveal that NATO–Altis relations soon deteriorated to the point that NATO peacekeepers were limited to the military-occupied island of Stratis.

The East Wind

Survive 
In July 2035, the NATO peacekeeping operation winds down, with their five-year commitment coming to an end. As the last remaining NATO peacekeepers, including U.S. Army infantryman Corporal Ben Kerry, prepare to leave Stratis, the AAF suddenly attacks NATO forces unprovoked, killing several soldiers including Adams, Kerry's commander. Kerry regroups with the surviving NATO soldiers, led by British Royal Navy special forces operators Captain Scott Miller and Lieutenant James, who attempt to gather supplies and communicate with NATO. Eventually, Miller manages to communicate with NATO command, who order them to secure a landing zone for reinforcements. The reinforcements land, but are defeated by Iranian CSAT forces that had arrived to support the AAF. The survivors attempt to flee to Altis, but their escape boats are attacked by AAF fighter jets, killing most of the survivors and knocking Kerry overboard.

Adapt 
Kerry wakes up on the shores of Altis and is contacted by James, who leads Kerry through a firefight in Kavala to his position. They link up with the northern cell of the FIA, led by former government agent Kostas Stavrou, and perform guerilla raids against the AAF and CSAT to supply themselves as their arms dealer, Nikos Panagopoulous, is missing. The FIA eventually rescues Nikos from an AAF camp on Stratis, where he has learned that NATO is planning to invade Altis. The FIA attack the AAF to support the invasion, but the landing NATO forces mistake the FIA for hostiles and fire on them; Kerry manages to rescue an allied pilot and communicate with NATO, resolving the confusion. Now back with NATO, Kerry inquires about Miller, but NATO commander Colonel David Armstrong informs Kerry that no such man exists, and that the British contingent had left the peacekeeping operation months prior.

Win 
Kerry returns to NATO's ranks, but is put on tedious and unimportant assignments due to Armstrong's distrust of him. Kerry proves his loyalty by repelling an attempted CSAT landing operation, and is eventually authorized to command NATO forces, though Armstrong orders him to cut all ties with Miller. During this time, several unusually frequent and strong earthquakes occur on the island, but NATO continues to push through Altis. Eventually, with CSAT withdrawing and the AAF on the verge of defeat, Armstrong rallies NATO forces for a final offensive to defeat the remaining AAF forces under Akhanteros' personal command. Kerry is suddenly contacted through a broken transmission by a mortally wounded James, who provides his location and asks for assistance.

Two endings are possible, depending on whether the player chooses to respond to James' distress call:

"Game Over": Kerry disobeys Armstrong and assists James, stealing a mysterious device from CSAT for Miller. It is revealed that Miller and James are part of CTRG Group 14, tasked with capturing the "Eastwind Device"—a CSAT tectonic weapon of mass destruction that caused the aforementioned earthquakes—which, unbeknownst to Kerry, is what he stole for Miller. Kerry is disavowed as a deserter by NATO and left to fend for himself (he can escape, be killed, or commit suicide), while CSAT learns Eastwind is in NATO's possession and invades Altis in retaliation, annihilating the NATO invasion force and sparking World War III.
"Status Quo": Kerry disregards James' transmission and continues with NATO orders. Kerry and Armstrong lead the final offensive against the AAF, and Akhanteros surrenders, ending the Altis Incident. One month later, Kerry, now promoted to Sergeant, is helping NATO stabilize the country. He meets a journalist at Altis' airport and drives him to a nearby town for an interview with Nikos, now the new president-elect of the disarmed Altis Republic.

Remnants of War

Days after the end of the Altis Incident, civilian Markos Kouris returns to his hometown of Oreokastro after learning his missing brother Alexis was seen at the town's church during a battle. As he investigates the church for evidence of his brother's whereabouts, he is killed by a landmine. Several days later, AAN News journalist Katherine Bishop conducts an online interview with IDAP bomb disposal expert Nathan MacDade, responsible for removing unexploded ordnance in Oreokastro, which suffered severe destruction during the Altis Incident. Nathan, who has worked in Oreokastro's IDAP camp since the Altian Civil War, recounts his experiences through five playable scenarios that follow the town during the war from the perspective of different factions. The player's actions in the scenarios affect how Nathan recounts the story.

 The first story, "The Peacekeeper", follows NATO Staff Sergeant Thomas Adams, helping IDAP direct an airdrop of humanitarian supplies while defending it from the FIA with the help of his AAF retinue. Nathan will comment if the player damages the supplies by misdirecting the airdrop.
 The second story, "The Guerilla", follows FIA rebel Alexis Kouris, who is tasked with stealing vehicles and planting landmines to build a barricade against an approaching AAF force. Nathan will comment on which vehicles the player uses to block the road.
 The third story, "The Redacted", follows a CSAT special forces team directing a cluster bomb airstrike on Oreokastro from nearby castle ruins to clear the way for the AAF. Nathan will mention if the player decides to wait for certain characters to leave the blast radius, and which building the player targets, but he is regardless shocked at the negligence of bombing a town with civilians in it. During the ending cutscene, Nathan mentions that NATO casings were found at the site, after which the two CSAT operators in the cutscene briefly flash to Miller and James, implying NATO and the CTRG were actually responsible for the airstrike.
 The fourth story, "The Survivor", follows civilian Markos Kouris, who is shot in the crossfire during an AAF assault and must limp to the IDAP-controlled church to be evacuated. Markos is technically neutral to the AAF, but certain actions—including picking up a gun, firing at AAF soldiers, or going too close to combatants—will provoke them. These actions will cause Nathan to muse on the nature of the attack on Oreokastro, and he will further lament the "newfound anger" of Markos if he kills AAF soldiers.
 The fifth and final story, "The Major", follows AAF Lieutenant Antoniou Dimitriou, who is pushed to Oreokastro with his commander Major Gavras during the NATO invasion. They deploy a landmine dispenser to defend their position from NATO and the FIA, and successfully withstand the assault. After the player kills one of the FIA fighters, Nathan reveals that he was Alexis Kouris, and that this battle is what led Markos to investigate.

After all five sequences are completed, Katherine asks Nathan who he thinks is most responsible for the tragedies of Oreokastro: NATO, CSAT, the AAF, the FIA, or "everyone and no one". Nathan's response and Katherine's article changes depending on the player's actions and answer. The player then takes control of Nathan and is tasked with clearing all of the mines in Oreokastro. Once the player chooses to leave, Nathan bids farewell to Katherine and gets in his van to go to his next assignment.

Apex Protocol

In August 2035, following a massive tsunami in Southeast Asia known as the Pacific Disaster, Syndikat rises to power in the Horizon Islands' province of Tanoa, overwhelming the Gendarmerie. Suspicious of Syndikat's rapid expansion and supply of equipment, NATO sends the CTRG to investigate, using a peacekeeping operation as cover.

CTRG Group 15, callsign "Raider", deploys to Tanoa and learns that CSAT member China is supplying Syndikat with weapons. During an operation to capture Syndikat leader Solomon Maru, Raider is ambushed by Viper Team, a high-tech Chinese special forces unit, and is forced to withdraw. Raider locates and rescues CTRG asset "Keystone", revealed to be Scott Miller. He reveals his true purpose on Altis, monitoring the Eastwind Device, and informs Raider that he believes China transported Eastwind to the South Pacific and deliberately caused the Pacific Disaster.

Raider raids a CSAT black site, only to find it attacked and abandoned; they learn Syndikat has double-crossed China and is holding Eastwind as ransom. The team also recovers documents concerning CSAT's "Apex Protocol", detailing how clandestine methods such as Eastwind can be used to manufacture crises and spread CSAT influence through recovery aid. The CTRG tracks Eastwind to a port on the northern coast of Tanoa, where CSAT is attempting to negotiate with Syndikat to recover it. When Maru unexpectedly arms Eastwind as leverage, the CTRG assaults the port and defeats Syndikat and Viper, kills Maru, and captures Eastwind. Following the operation, NATO quietly leaks redacted Apex Protocol documents to the press, prompting global condemnation of CSAT's expansionism.

Old Man
In 2038, three years after the events of Apex Protocol, Tanoa is suffering from a severe malaria outbreak. The Horizon Islands, frustrated with the concurrent withdrawal of NATO peacekeepers, asks CSAT for aid. CSAT sends doctors and researchers, but also soldiers, who build bases and a laboratory on Tanoa and use the Gendarmerie against the populace.

Santiago, a retired French Legionnaire, investigates CSAT's activities for Scott Miller and the CTRG; they believe the outbreak has been engineered by CSAT. Their most damning evidence is a convoy of CSAT trucks seen carrying unidentified containers into the village of Tobakoro, whose inhabitants all died of malaria shortly after. Santiago is approached by Dr. Drábek, a virologist from Luganville, a town that has also received shipments of the containers; Drábek, who does not trust CSAT and has hidden his patients from them, asks Santiago for help finding a cure.

Infiltrating a CSAT-controlled port, Santiago confirms his suspicions: CSAT is developing "Atrox", a malaria super-strain used as a biological weapon. Santiago gathers evidence for Miller, whose plan to assault the lab developing Atrox is hindered by their sentry gun defenses. Santiago is forced to work for L'Ensemble to earn the trust of their leader Samjo, who gives him a device that can disable the sentry guns.

Santiago and the CTRG raid and destroy the lab, and Santiago recovers an Atrox counteragent. However, Miller, Drábek, and Samjo each ask Santiago to give them the counteragent. The ending of Old Man depends on who Santiago gives the counteragent to, though none are confirmed as canon:

 If Santiago leaves the counteragent with Miller, NATO develops a vaccine and reveals CSAT's complicity, fracturing the alliance and forcing them out of Tanoa. However, by the time the vaccine is made and distributed, countless Tanoans have already died. Though Tanoa is finally at peace, Santiago is now alone, as everyone he knows has died of Atrox.
 If Santiago kills Miller and gives the counteragent to Drábek, the Global Health Initiative develops a vaccine and a cure. But without Miller's evidence, the public never learns of CSAT's involvement, and CSAT continues to develop Atrox unabated. The occupation continues on Tanoa as Santiago flees to avoid L'Ensemble's wrath, having angered Samjo for not giving him the counteragent.
 If Santiago kills Miller and sells the counteragent to Samjo, L'Ensemble sells the counteragent on the black market, and it eventually reaches the GHI, but without documentation. With no data, vaccine tests are ineffective and a cure is never made, allowing Atrox to spread and worsen. Santiago, paid generously by Samjo for his loyalty, leaves Tanoa to avoid the CTRG and selfishly lives out the rest of his life.

Tac-Ops

Beyond Hope 
In 2026, the AAF seizes power in Altis and Stratis, overthrowing the democratic government and violently suppressing opposition and dissent; the deposed government forms the Government Loyalists to fight back, sparking the Altian Civil War. With the conflict sparking a humanitarian crisis, the Loyalists and the AAF soon agree to a ceasefire, but this is broken after the AAF ambushes a Loyalist squad at the village of Orino; the Loyalists respond by capturing the village. Later, when the AAF withholds IDAP aid from the town of Abdera by setting up a blockade in nearby Galati, the Loyalists, covertly supported by CTRG Group 13, clear the blockade and push the AAF out of both towns. The Civil War continues until 2030, by which point the AAF junta is recognized as the government of Altis, and the Loyalists have reorganized as a new organization: the FIA.

Stepping Stone 
In July 2035, the U.S. Sixth Fleet arrives at the island of Malden to secure air superiority over the Strait of Gibraltar and use Malden's strategic location as a "stepping stone" for the invasion of Altis. NATO's presence on Malden, which already has a substantial CSAT presence, is accepted by Chinese garrisons on the island as a sign of goodwill (and to avoid escalation), but the North African Scimitar Regiment resists. NATO forces assault Scimitar's positions, capturing most of the island south of the capital of La Trinité. Though NATO holds back to not provoke Chinese forces, China officially refuses to support Scimitar. NATO promptly advances on La Trinité and northern Malden, and the remnants of Scimitar surrender, allowing the NATO invasion to progress.

Steel Pegasus 
In August 2035, after an assault on Altis' heavily-guarded airport fails, NATO launches Operation Steel Pegasus, where the U.S. Army's 21st Brigade Combat Team, split into LZ Blazer and LZ Mustang, lands in southeastern Altis to capture the city of Chalkeia, with the intent of diverting CSAT and AAF forces away from the airport for NATO forces to capture it. However, their VTOLs come under anti-air fire, especially those at LZ Mustang; one of them is shot down over hostile territory, killing all on board except Corporal Louis Barklem. Barklem rescues downed pilot Terry Simpson, and together they recover other LZ Mustang survivors, repel an AAF assault on their rendezvous point, and attempt to reach LZ Blazer. Barklem commandeers an IFV to support the LZ Mustang survivors, who manage to link up with forces from LZ Blazer. The unified NATO landing force captures Chalkeia, successfully diverting enemy forces from the airport and allowing its capture.

Altis Requiem 
In April 2035, AAF Captain Kyros Kalogeros of the 1st Mechanized Division makes a delivery to an outpost in his AWC Nyx light tank, but finds the installation deserted with its commanding officer killed. Kalogeros deduces the soldiers defected to the FIA, finds them a nearby village, and defeats the defectors and the rebels.

Four months later, during the invasion, Kalogeros and the 1st lead a counteroffensive against NATO to defend the towns of Pyrgos and Dorida. Issued CSAT T-140 Angara main battle tanks, the 1st manage to defeat NATO armor and push them away from the towns, achieving the AAF's first victory against the NATO invasion. However, both towns quickly fall regardless, and within less than a week the AAF suffers heavy casualties and is pushed back to split fronts along the eastern coast; nevertheless, Akhanteros orders the AAF to continue fighting so CSAT can withdraw and hold a better position in post-war negotiations. Using advanced T-140 Angaras once again, the 1st fend off NATO's assault on the southern front until their tanks run out of ammunition. After Akhanteros capitulates, Kalogeros destroys his T-140 to prevent its capture and surrenders as NATO troops surround him.

Kalogeros is taken to a POW camp for processing. The ending of Altis Requiem depends on whether the player avoided collateral damage and killing civilians. If the player had bad conduct, Kalogeros is tried as a war criminal and executed by firing squad, but if the player had good conduct, Kalogeros is released and retires to live in peace.

First Contact 
In 2039, NATO and the LDF conduct a training exercise at a Livonian factory when a live fire drone strike inexplicably goes far off target, killing several soldiers. As U.S. Army drone operator Specialist Aiden Rudwell and his squad rush to help, a root-like organism erupts from the factory, almost killing Rudwell's friend, Corporal Jack Stype. Two weeks later, the factory is quarantined by the LDF, and NATO is ordered to leave Livonia. Rudwell and Stype, suspicious of the factory quarantine, sneak in and learn the LDF is secretly monitoring the roots, of which there are now two.

Suddenly, a massive "alien flying object" appears over the factory and releases an electromagnetic pulse that disables vehicles and electronics across the country. Rudwell and Stype retreat to Camp Kresnik, where NATO and the LDF have gathered to investigate. NATO commander Major Homewood introduces the soldiers to researchers Dr. Ian Kesson and Šimon Čapek, who inform them that the AFO arrived to gather the roots (part of a larger network), and that the roots release signals that caused the drone strike to go off target. NATO and the LDF set out to investigate as paranormal phenomena occur in Livonia.

Meanwhile, Kesson and Čapek attempt to communicate with the AFO. Rudwell uses an electromagnetic spectrum device, to which the AFO responds with hallucinations of an alien world, causing Rudwell to seize. The soldiers, believing he was attacked, open fire, but are killed by the AFO's telekinetic powers; though Homewood orders NATO to cease fire, the LDF orders an artillery barrage on the AFO. Stype, fearing this could spark an intergalactic war, threatens to destroy Camp Kresnik if the LDF does not stand down and kills Homewood when he tries to stop him, sparking conflict between NATO and the LDF. Rudwell, Stype, Kesson, Čapek, and NATO forces regroup to investigate the extraterrestrials, while the LDF attempts to destroy the AFO and the roots; both are hounded by looters and deserters. After finding evidence of a third party's presence, the survivors are briefly captured by a group of Russians, but are freed by Stype after they leave.

After a particularly vivid hallucination that implies there are more root networks on Earth, Rudwell and the survivors are invited to meet with the Russians, who reveal they are a Spetsnaz unit tasked with monitoring the roots. They reveal a decayed root was accidentally ruptured in Russia 19 years prior, causing a massive explosion; fearing the LDF's attack on an entire living root network could inadvertently destroy Livonia, if not all of Eastern Europe, Russia and NATO join forces to stop the LDF. Together, they repel a massive LDF assault on the uprooted root network, allowing the AFO to safely leave Earth. The Russian military soon arrives as backup, forcing the LDF to stand down. In the aftermath, the world grapples with the reality that they are not alone, as efforts are launched to communicate with the extraterrestrials.

Development

Bohemia Interactive officially announced the development of Arma 3 on May 19, 2011. In June 2012, an alpha version of the game was demonstrated at E3. In August 2013, Bohemia announced that they would release three downloadable content episodes for free after the game's initial launch.

An alpha version of the game was released on March 5, 2013. The beta version was released on June 25, 2013, and anyone who owned the alpha had their copy automatically upgraded to the beta.

The final version of Arma 3 was launched on September 12, 2013. At its launch, Arma 3 featured more showcase missions and the large island of Altis.

Arma 3 uses a new version of Bohemia Interactive's Real Virtuality game engine. Arma 3, like its predecessors, uses the SQF Syntax scripting language.

Downloadable content
In Arma 3, downloadable content falls under two categories: "platform content", which is present in the game; and "expansion content", which is not preloaded and must be purchased and mounted to the game to be accessed. All Creator DLCs and most of the Contact DLC are considered expansion content, and are mostly considered non-canon in the Arma universe.

Platform content

Zeus
Zeus was released on April 10, 2014, as a free DLC update for Arma 3. The first DLC released for the game, Zeus was announced in February 2014. Zeus allows a player to take control of a gamemaster entity (the titular Zeus) that has full control over the battlefield of a particular scenario. The interface allows Zeus to place, delete, and modify soldiers, vehicles, and static objects, as well as manage game logic, command enemy forces, and control the flow of a mission.

Karts
Karts was released on May 29, 2014, as the first paid DLC released for Arma 3. The DLC added over 20 types of go-karts to the game, as well as racing outfits, time trial scenarios and a wide range of static props for creating race tracks. Karts was not initially intended to be released: it originated as an April Fool's Day joke in 2014, when Bohemia Interactive released a fake trailer showcasing the then-fictional Karts DLC, featuring a parody of Jean-Claude Van Damme's Epic Split starring campaign character Scott Miller. However, its popularity within the Arma community led Bohemia to officially announce the actual release of the Karts DLC.

Helicopters
Helicopters was released on November 4, 2014, as the second paid DLC released for Arma 3. The DLC added two new helicopters, the NATO CH-67 Huron (based on the CH-47 Chinook) and the CSAT Mi-290 Taru (based on the Ka-226), as well as new singleplayer scenarios and time trials. The Helicopters DLC debuted with the Helicopters Update for Arma 3, which was a free platform update that added features such as firing from vehicles, cargo hooks for helicopters, and an advanced helicopter flight model based on Bohemia's Take On Helicopters flight system.

Marksmen
Marksmen was released on April 8, 2015, as the third paid DLC released for Arma 3. The content added was focused at improving long-range sniper gameplay, and features new weapons and weapon attachments, outfits such as ghillie suits, and singleplayer scenarios. The Marksmen DLC debuted with the Marksmen Update, a free platform update which introduced new weapon mechanics such as weapon stabilization and bipods, improved AI and suppression mechanics, enhanced soundscapes, and a new multiplayer game mode, "End Game".

Apex
Apex was released on July 11, 2016, as the first full content expansion for Arma 3, adding content to most aspects of the base game. Originally announced as part of Bohemia's roadmap for 2015–2016, Apex added the Southeast Asian island of Tanoa, part of the Horizon Islands, a former French colony. Apex introduced the Apex Protocol campaign, Old Man mini-campaign, and numerous new vehicles, uniforms, factions, weapons, and editor props. Apex debuted with the Apex Update, a free platform update that introduced a new lighting system, improvements to rendering and performance, and a variety of other content.

Jets
Jets was released on May 16, 2017, as the fifth paid DLC released for Arma 3, and the first to be produced jointly with another developer, being co-developed by Bohemia Interactive and Bravo Zero One Studios. The added content was focused around expanding fixed-wing aircraft gameplay, most notably featuring new fighter jets: the NATO F/A-181 Black Wasp II (based on the F/A-18E Super Hornet), the CSAT To-201 Shikra (based on the Su-57/Su-35), and the AAF A-149 Gryphon (based on the JAS 39 Gripen). The DLC also introduced new aircraft-focused objects, including a NATO drone (Sentinel UCAV, based on the X-47B), radars, anti-air weapons, and aircraft-focused props for placing in the editor, including a Gerald R. Ford-class nuclear-powered aircraft carrier named the USS Freedom. Jets debuted with the Jets Update, a free platform update that overhauled the existing sensory system, targeting and tracking, aircraft damage model, and plane systems, and introduced a dynamic aircraft loadout system.

Malden 2035
Malden 2035 was released on June 22, 2017, as a free DLC update for Arma 3. Its primary inclusion was a total remake of the fictional Mediterranean island of Malden, featured as the primary setting of Operation Flashpoint: Cold War Crisis, the first game in the Arma series. Malden's overhaul was originally developed for the now-defunct free-to-play competitive FPS Project Argo, but was ported to Arma 3 and released alongside Project Argo on the 16th anniversary of Operation Flashpoint's release. The update also included a new dynamic gameplay scenario titled "Combat Patrol", which was retroactively ported to the rest of Arma 3'''s terrains.

Laws of WarLaws of War was released on September 7, 2017, as the sixth paid DLC released for Arma 3, focusing on the human impact of war and humanitarianism. Laws of War was developed by Bohemia's Amsterdam studio under the codename "Orange". The DLC was created in cooperation with the International Committee of the Red Cross, with a portion of its initial proceeds going to the ICRC. The DLC added a variety of new content focused around humanitarian aid, with new props and equipment themed around the fictional humanitarian NGO the International Development and Aid Project (IDAP), as well as the Remnants of War campaign.

Tac-Ops Mission PackTac-Ops Mission Pack, also known as the Tac-Ops DLC, was released on November 20, 2017, as the seventh paid DLC released for Arma 3. The DLC adds three mini-campaign scenarios—Beyond Hope, Stepping Stone, and Steel Pegasus—that follow events that occur before and during The East Wind. The scenarios, designed to challenge the player's tactical skills, feature unique after action reports, consisting of videos from Bohemia's military consultants giving insight about the missions and about Arma 3 in general. The Tac-Ops Mission Pack was released alongside a free platform update that added Steam achievements and introduced a major overhaul to the game's SQF scripting system, giving content creators greater freedom and ease of use.

TanksTanks was released on April 11, 2018, as the eighth paid DLC released for Arma 3, and the last piece of content to be developed for Arma 3 by Bohemia Interactive's Czech studio. The DLC, focusing on armored warfare, introduced three new armored vehicles, primarily intended to be competent at competing with other armored vehicles: the NATO Rhino MGS tank destroyer (based on the Rooikat), the CSAT T-140 Angara main battle tank (based on the T-14 Armata), and the AAF AWC Nyx light tank (based on the Wiesel AWC). The DLC also includes up-armored variants of several base game vehicles and the Altis Requiem mini-campaign. Tanks was released with the free Tanks Update, a platform update that introduced a variety of improvements to armored combat, including new anti-tank weapons, an improved vehicle handling and damage system, a multiplayer mode titled "Vanguard", and other content.

Expansion content
ContactContact was released on July 25, 2019, as the ninth paid DLC released for Arma 3. Set in the  terrain "Livonia", Contact adds two factions, the Livonian Defense Force and Russian Spetsnaz, new weapons and equipment, and the First Contact campaign. Due to Contact's departure from the traditional realism of the Arma series, the events of First Contact are considered non-canon. Though most of Contact is expansion content, some aspects of the DLC, such as the weapons and equipment, are treated as platform content.

Global MobilizationGlobal Mobilization was released on April 29, 2019, as the tenth paid DLC released for Arma 3. It includes a 10-mission singleplayer campaign, 4 factions (West Germany, East Germany, Poland, and Denmark), 70 vehicles, 30 weapons, new infantry clothing and gear, 17 multiplayer scenarios, and the  terrain "Weferlingen". Set in 1983 during the Cold War, Global Mobilization's campaign, State Scarlet, follows West Germany's attempts to defend against an East German invasion in a "Cold War gone hot" scenario. Global Mobilization was the first entry in Bohemia's Creator DLC Program, consisting of DLCs created by the Arma modding community and third-party developers; Global Mobilization was developed by Vertexmacht.

S.O.G Prairie FireS.O.G. Prairie Fire was released on May 6, 2021, as the eleventh paid DLC released for Arma 3. It includes a 6-mission co-op campaign with up to 14 players, 5 singleplayer scenarios, 4 factions (MACV-SOG, People's Army of Vietnam, Viet Cong, and Army of the Republic of Vietnam), 54 vehicles, 55 weapons, 41 different uniforms, and the 300 km2 terrain "Cam Lao Nam" (a combination of Cambodia, Laos, and Vietnam). Set during the Vietnam War, the S.O.G Prairie Fire campaign follows the actions of MACV-SOG Spike Team Columbia throughout the war. Part of the Creator DLC Program, S.O.G. Prairie Fire was developed by third party studio Savage Game Design, created to develop Vietnam War games.

On September 30, 2021, a free update for S.O.G. Prairie Fire was released, adding 3 factions (MACV-SOG Naval Advisory Detachment, U.S. Navy SEALs, U.S. Navy Underwater Demolition Team), 31 uniforms, new helmets and vests, 9 weapons, 6 vehicles, new diving mechanics, and the 225 km2 terrain "Khe Sanh". A second free update, released July 12, 2022, added 2 campaign missions, 6 new factions (Australia, New Zealand, Republic of Korea, CIA, Pathet Lao, and the Royal Lao Army), 20 uniforms, new accessories, 8 weapons, 13 vehicles, and the 25 km2 terrain "The Bra", a section of the Ho Chi Minh trail.

CSLA Iron CurtainCSLA Iron Curtain was released on June 16, 2021, as the twelfth paid DLC released for Arma 3. It includes 9 singleplayer scenarios, 9 multiplayer missions, a singleplayer showcase, 3 factions (United States Armed Forces, Czechoslovak People's Army, and Czech FIA), 30 vehicles, 35 weapons, new uniforms for all factions, and the 256 km2 terrain "Gabreta". Set during the Cold War in the mid-1980s at a border region of Czechoslovakia, the 15-mission Iron Curtain campaign follows a Czech FIA rebel fighting the Czech communist government during a "Cold War gone hot" scenario. Part of the Creator DLC Program, CSLA Iron Curtain, was developed by third party studio ČSLA Studio, a Czech development team composed of Arma modders.

The release of CSLA Iron Curtain was met with criticism from the community, who claimed the DLC was unfinished, poor-quality, and lacked enough content to justify its price. On June 24, 2021, Bohemia Interactive released a statement saying that they "recognize that [they] did not do enough to ensure the appropriate quality of this particular Creator DLC" and that they would be offering no-questions-asked refunds for the next 36 days up until July 30, 2021.

Western SaharaWestern Sahara was released on November 18, 2021, as the thirteenth paid DLC released for Arma 3. It includes a co-op campaign, 2 multiplayer scenarios, a singleplayer showcase, 4 factions (UNA Peacekeepers, Sefrawi Freedom and Independence Army, Tura, ION Services), 9 variants of existing vehicles, 9 weapons, new equipment (including a ballistic shield and a usable ZU-23-2 anti-aircraft turret), new uniforms, and the 100 km2 terrain "Sefrou-Ramal". Set in 2036 in the Arma universe, the DLC's Extraction campaign follows Team Sword and Team Shield of the private military company ION Services, who are hired to rescue a kidnapped journalist from the Tura insurgency in the midst of an internal conflict in the Saharan country of Argana. Part of the Creator DLC Program, Western Sahara was developed by Rotators Collective.

Other content updates
The Bootcamp Update, released on July 14, 2014, added training content, a Virtual Reality terrain, and the Prologue campaign.

The Nexus update, released on December 1, 2015, added an improved version of the official multiplayer mission "End Game", a spectator mode, and multiple improvements to soldier protection, stamina, and audio.

The Eden update, released on February 18, 2016, added an in-game 3D editor, making the creation of missions easier. It also included launcher and server browser improvements, and an update to the audio system.

A Visual Update was released with the 1.60 update, in May 2016, in advance of the Apex update.

The 1.84 update was released on August 1, 2018, alongside the Encore content pack, which contains additional anti-air assets, fixed-wing armaments, and the fictional Liberty-class destroyer.

The 1.86 update, released on December 8, 2018, added the "Warlords" multiplayer mission, based on a capture the island (CTI) scenario.

The 2.00 update, Released on October 14, 2020, added the ability for players for share custom compositions from the game directly to the Steam Workshop, a new firing range scenario, new variants of CTRG uniforms, and a special forces-themed variant of the P07 pistol.

ReceptionArma 3 has received favorable reviews, garnering a score of 74 out of 100 on the review aggregation website Metacritic based on 38 reviews, and a user score of 7.6 based on 1048 ratings.

Praise was directed toward the gameplay, game engine, graphics, physics, and sense of realism, but criticism was directed toward the game's difficulty, unfriendliness toward new and inexperienced players, and complex controls. Many reviewers noted the game's heightened focus on user-generated content compared to older Arma titles, complimenting the ease of installing content through the Steam Workshop. Significant early criticism focused on the lack of singleplayer content on release, with some critics calling the game unfinished due to its initial lack of a campaign.PC Gamer selected the game to be their simulation game of 2013. Arma 3 won the Technical Contribution to Czech Video Game Creation Award at the 2013 Czech Game of the Year Awards, and the Czech Game of the Year Award at Boom 2013. Rock, Paper, Shotgun placed Arma 3 16th on their list of best FPS games of all time, and 10th on their list of best simulation games of all time.

The islands of Altis and Stratis received much praise. The Guardian included them along with Chernarus (the setting of Arma 2 and DayZ) in their list of top 10 most beautiful video game environments.

In 2022, Arma 3 was among the military video games featured in the Imperial War Museum's "War Games" exhibit. Exhibit curator Chris Cooper highlighted Arma 3's realism, the freedom and agency of the sandbox-like gameplay, the social engagement of the team-based multiplayer, and what that engagement teaches players about conflict and teamwork.

It was announced on May 28, 2014, that the game had sold one million copies. In October 2015, sales had reached two million units, and by March 2017 it reached 3 million sales. The game has sold 5 million copies as of June 2019.

Controversies
Espionage arrests

On September 10, 2012, Greek media reported that two Czech nationals working for Bohemia Interactive were arrested on the Greek island Lemnos and charged with espionage. The two men took photographs and recorded videos of Hellenic Armed Forces installations on Lemnos, allegedly to use in the development of Arma 3. Under Greek law, taking pictures and recordings of defense installations is prohibited for reasons of national security. Prior to the incident, the issue of the game causing potential threats to Greek national security was discussed in the Hellenic Parliament in 2011.

The two men were identified as Martin Pezlar and Ivan Buchta after an earlier misidentification. Bohemia confirmed their employment, but stated that the pair were on vacation in Lemnos and were not sent there by the company in an official capacity. Pezlar and Buchta denied the charges of espionage, maintaining that they "went just to a holiday [...] to enjoy the beauty of the island", noting that the layout of the virtual island in the development studio "was practically done" prior to their arrival, and that any photos or videos taken by them were intended as memorabilia and would not be used in the game's development. After being held in custody for 128 days, the Greek government released the pair from custody on January 15, 2013.

While the two were imprisoned, Bohemia shut down their "Greek Military" thread on their official forums and made several statements regarding the situation, discussing legal matters and warning forum users regarding the legal issues of photographing military installations. As a result of the incident, on February 2, 2013, Bohemia announced that the name of the main island "Lemnos" would be changed to "Altis". The Greek island of Lemnos was chosen as inspiration after Bohemia CEO Marek Španěl had visited the place on vacation. According to Bohemia, the name change is meant to emphasize that the game is fiction. The name of the game's smaller island, "Stratis", remained unchanged.

Ban in Iran
On September 19, 2012, the Iran Computer and Video Games Foundation and the Iranian Revolutionary Guard Corps denied Bohemia Interactive's license to sell Arma 3 in Iran and banned the game's sale in the country for its depiction of the Iran Armed Forces. In Arma 3, Iran is portrayed as a member of the CSAT faction, a rival to NATO and one of the story's main antagonists; early builds of the game also did not feature CSAT and instead featured the Iranian military as the sole antagonists.

 Combat footage hoaxes 
Gameplay footage of Arma 3 has frequently been mistaken for actual combat footage, deliberately misrepresented as such in fake news, or used in propaganda. In-game footage is edited or modified to prevent easy identification of the hoax. Arma hoaxes typically consist of shaky low-resolution footage of anti-aircraft warfare in nighttime settings, with land or people rarely visible, often depicting the unrealistic application of military assets (such as American C-RAM systems destroying American aircraft). Some hoaxes may also unintentionally leave in gameplay features, such as visible HUD elements or in-game sound effects.

In September 2018, Russian state-run news channel Channel One Russia aired footage from Arma 3, claiming to show Russian Su-25 attack aircraft conducting an airstrike on a military convoy during the Syrian Civil War. Channel One claimed the clip was accidentally reused from an archived report about computer games. Following the announcement of the withdrawal of U.S. forces from Afghanistan in April 2021, a Facebook post claiming to show the Taliban shooting down an American military transport plane received millions of views; however, the video was actually taken from a demonstration of a Phalanx CIWS mod for Arma 3. In May 2021, supposed footage of Israeli anti-aircraft missiles being used against Hamas was sourced to Arma 3. In September 2021, Republic TV broadcast footage purportedly showing a Pakistani anti-aircraft tank supporting the Taliban by firing at an American A-10 Thunderbolt II. Several sources, including journalist Mohammed Zubair, noticed the clip was from Arma 3; Republic TV promptly deleted their online posts of the video. In August 2022, amid tense Chinese military exercises around Taiwan, a video of "military helicopters from China attacking Taiwan" was found to originate from an Arma 3 livestream.Arma 3 has been used to produce hoax videos claiming to depict events in the Russo-Ukrainian War since the start of the Russian invasion of Ukraine, when a video of a Ukrainian anti-aircraft gun shooting down a Russian military jet received hundreds of thousands of views before being exposed as a hoax made in Arma 3; parts of the clip were previously used in January 2020, under the similarly false claim that it was an American anti-aircraft weapon destroying an Iranian missile. Other hoaxes related to the Russian invasion have claimed to depict a drone attack on Russian naval vessels, an attack helicopter destroying a Russian convoy, Ukrainian soldiers ambushing a Russian tank with an NLAW, Russian TU-95 and Russian missiles destroying crewed NATO tanks traveling to Ukraine.

Bohemia Interactive is aware of the frequent use of Arma games in military hoaxes, and has confirmed Arma 3's use in several hoaxes. Bohemia CEO Marek Španěl told PC Gamer in 2012 that he was "surprised" that Arma gameplay could be confused for real footage so easily. In November 2022, Bohemia officially acknowledged the use of Arma games in combat footage hoaxes and published an official guide to help viewers identify hoaxes made in video games.

SequelArma 4 was announced on May 17, 2022. Arma Reforger, a standalone preview using the new Enfusion engine, entered early access on the same day. It is the first Arma'' game to be released simultaneously on PC and Xbox.

Notes

References

External links

2013 video games
Bohemia Interactive games
Cooperative video games
Early access video games
First-person shooters
Science fiction shooter video games
Linux games
MacOS games
Multiplayer and single-player video games
Multiplayer online games
Open-world video games
Video games with Steam Workshop support
Tactical shooter video games
Third-person shooters
Video game controversies
Video game sequels
Video games developed in the Czech Republic
Video games set in the Czech Republic
Video games set in Eastern Europe
Video games set in Europe
Video games set in Germany
Video games set in Vietnam
Video games set on islands
Video games set in the 2030s
Video games with alternate endings
Video games with expansion packs
Video games with user-generated gameplay content
War video games
Cold War video games
Vietnam War video games
Windows games
World War III video games
Arma (series)
Multiplayer vehicle operation games